This article provides details of international football games played by the Nigeria national football team from 2020 to present.

Results

2020

2021

2022

Forthcoming fixtures
The following matches are scheduled:

Head to head records

References

Football in Nigeria
Nigeria national football team
2020s in Nigerian sport